USS Julia Luckenbach (ID-2407) was a cargo ship and troop transport that served in the United States Navy from 1918 to 1919.

SS Julia Luckenbach was built as a commercial cargo ship in 1917 at Quincy, Massachusetts, by Fore River Shipbuilding Corporation for Luckenbach Steamship Company of New York City. For about a year in 1917 and 1918, she operated under charter to the United States Army. The U.S. Navy acquired her for World War I service on 7 August 1918. Assigned Identification Number (Id. No.) 2407, she was commissioned on 15 August 1918 as USS Julia Luckenbach.

Assigned to the Naval Overseas Transportation Service, Julia Luckenbach departed New York City on 10 September 1918 with cargo for U.S. military forces in Europe, arriving at Marseilles, France, on 24 September 1918.

After the Armistice with Germany was signed on 11 November 1918, bringing World War I to an end, Julia Luckenbach was transferred to the Cruiser and Transport Force. In her new postwar role as a troop transport, she continued to transport cargo to France while returning to the United States with troops, patients, and other military personnel coming home after the war.

Julia Luckenbach arrived in New York at the end of her final cruise in U.S. Navy service in July 1919 and remained there until she decommissioned on 9 September 1919. She was returned to Luckenbach Steamship Company the same day.

Once again SS Julia Luckenbach, she resumed commercial service as a cargo ship, continuing in this role until September 1943 when, during World War II, she was badly damaged and declared a "constructive total loss."

References

Department of the Navy: Naval Historical Center Online Library of Selected Images:  Civilian Ships: S.S. Julia Luckenbach (American Freighter, 1917). Served as USS Julia Luckenbach (ID # 2407) in 1918-1919
NavSource Online: Section Patrol Craft Photo Archive: Julia Luckenbach (ID 2407)

World War I cargo ships of the United States
Ships built in Quincy, Massachusetts
1916 ships
Cargo ships of the United States Navy
Unique transports of the United States Navy
World War I transports of the United States